Folklore of Indonesia is known in Indonesian as dongeng, cerita rakyat or folklor, refer to any folklore found in Indonesia. Its origins are probably an oral culture, with a range of stories of heroes associated with wayang and other forms of theatre, transmitted outside of a written culture. Folklore in Indonesia are closely connected with mythology.

Themes 
Indonesian folklore reflects the diverse culture of Indonesia as well as the diversity of ethnic groups in Indonesia. Many ethnic groups have their own collection of tales and folklores that have been told for generations. The stories are usually told to children as bedtime stories, and have pedagogical values such as kindness, benevolence, modesty, honesty, bravery, patience, persistence, virtue, and morality. For example, one popular theme is "the truth will always prevail, and evil will always be defeated."

While most Indonesian folkloric stories have happy endings and 'happily ever after' themes, some employ tragedy and have sad endings.

Forms 
Most Indonesian folklore started as oral tradition told by storytellers and parents for generations within Indonesian villages. The stories were often sung or chanted in several oral traditions such as pantun, tembang, or children's chants. Some were performed in performing arts such as wayang and sendratari (dance drama). In Malay tradition, some of them are written in scripture as hikayat, while in Javanese tradition, several stories are connected with historical figures and historical records such as babad or older kakawin scriptures such as Pararaton. Indian Hindu-Buddhist epics also influenced Indonesian folklore, especially through wayang and dance drama in Java and Bali. The Hindu epics the Ramayana and Mahabharata have become their own separate versions with Indonesian twists and interpretations that often differ from the Indian versions. The Buddhist Jataka tales also has made its way into Indonesian fables and animal folklores. Jataka stories are found carved as narrative bas-reliefs on ancient Javanese candis, such as the Mendut, Borobudur and Sajiwan temples; telling animal fables about the virtues of Buddha, who performed exceptional acts of kindness in his animal incarnations before being reborn as a Boddhisattva and the future Buddha.

These stories have been collected and used in the Indonesian education system, in small cheap books, usually tied in with a district or region of Indonesia. Many stories explain events or establish moral allegories using iconic or symbolic characters of the past. They also seek to explain the origins of names of people and places from Folk etymology.

During the Suharto era, there were sections of the Indonesian Department of Education and Culture that researched and wrote reports on collected cerita rakyat.

List of Indonesian folklore
There are several genres of Indonesian folklore.

Tales
The story of the struggle of a common protagonist to finally achieve happiness despite facing many problems.
 Ande Ande Lumut
 Bawang Putih Bawang Merah
 Jaka Tarub
 Timun Mas
 Roro Mendut
 Putri Tangguk
 Calon Arang

Legends
The stories that try to explain the origins of certain places, names and/or things.
 Aji Saka
 Banyuwangi
 Dewi Sri
 Lanun
 Legend of the Centipede Lake
Lutung Kasarung
 Minangkabau
 Malin Kundang
 Parahyangan
 Rara Jonggrang
 Sangkuriang
 Sulanjana
 Watu Gunung

Epic
Heroic tales of struggles, battles and war. The story of a hero adventure and their exploits.
 Ciung Wanara
 Damarwulan
 Dayang Bandir and Sandean Raja
 Ken Arok and Ken Dedes
 Lutung Kasarung
 Mundinglaya Dikusumah
 Pangeran Katak
 Panji Semirang
 Siliwangi 
 Si Pitung

Fable
Animal tales, featuring animals that behave like humans or interact and speak with humans.
 Leungli
 Sang Kancil
 Keong Emas
 Cenderawasih

Myth
Witch, demon, spirit or ghost tales, based on urban legends or supernatural phenomena.
 Calon Arang
 Kuntilanak
 Nyai Roro Kidul
 Rangda
 Wewe Gombel
 Sundel Bolong
 Toyol

By region

Folklore from Java 

 Kalarahu
 Jaka Tarub and Nawangwulan
 Origin of the Name Banyuwangi
 Origin of the Kelud Mountain
 Origin of the Baturaden
 Bawang Putih and Bawah Merah
 Asal Mula Huruf Jawa/Aji Saka
 Si Wuragil
 Loro Jonggrang and Bandung Bondowoso
 Legend of Suronggotho
 Dewi Sri and Sedana
 Ande-Ande Lumur and Klenting Kuning
 Awan Wedus Gembel

Folklore from Bali 

 Cupak ajak Gerantang
 I Belog Pengangon Bebek
 I Duma
 I Ketimun Mas
 I Lutung Teken I Kakua
 I Pucung
 Siap Selem
 I Sugih ajak  I Tiwas
 Naga Besuki
 Ni Bawang Teken Ni Kesuna
 Calon Arang

Folklore from Sumatera 

 Asal Mula Danau Laut Tawar
 Asal Mula Dana Si Losung dan Si Pinggan
 Asal Mula Sungai Ombilin dan Danau Singkar
 Asal Usul Silampari
 Buaya Perompak
 Hang Tuah
 Hikayat Keramat Bujang
 Kera Putih dan Tali Kapal
 Kisah Pohon Enau
 Legenda Batu Gantung
 Legenda Beru Ginting Sope Mbelin
 Legenda Danau Toba
 Legenda Ikan Patin
 Legenda Lau Kawar
 Legenda Mas Merah
 Legenda Namora Pande Bosi
 Legenda Pulau Kapal
 Legenda Putri Bidadari
 Legenda Putri Hijau
 Legenda Putri Nai Mangale
 Legenda Putri Runduk
 Legenda Putri Ular dari Simalungun
 Legenda Sampuraga
 Si Gale-Gale Legend
 Legenda Simardan
 Legenda si Lancang
 Legenda Ular Kepala Tujuh
 Musang Berjanggut
 Pati Enggang dan Rio Brani
 Putri Pandan Berduri
 Dragon Princess
 Raja Pareeket
 Raja yang Culas
 Malin Kundang
 Si Miskin yang Tamak
 Si Pahit Lidah
 Si Sigarlaki dan si Limbat
 Sungai Jodoh
 Ting Gegenting
 Ular n'Daung
The Legend Of The Origin Of The Silver Catfish
Kisah Putri Ular

Folklore from Kalimantan 

 Legend of the Centipede Lake (Legenda Danau Lipan)
The Greedy Fisherman (Asal Muasal Danau Kawat)

Folklore from Papua 

 Biwar the Dragon Slayer
 Kweiya
 The Story of the Caracal and the Quail
 Watuwe the Mystic Crocodile
 The Origin of the Irian Island

Folklore from Sulawesi 

 The Origin of the Mermaid
 Legend of the La Dana and Buffalo
 La Upe and Stepmother
 Pakande the Grandmother
 Putri Tandampalik
 Sawerigading & We Tenriabeng
 Lamadukelleng the Crowned Prince

Folklore from Moluccas 

 Nenek Luhu
 Batu Badaong
 Bulu Pamali
 Suanggi
 Legenda Tanifai
 Buaya Tembaga
 Petualangan Empat Kapiten
 Batu Belah
 Asal Mula Telaga Biru

References

Further reading (in English)

Further reading (In Indonesian)
 Danandjaja, James (1992) Cerita Rakyat dar Jawa Tengah Jakarta: Grasindo. 
 Setyawan, Dwianto (1992) Cerita Rakyat dari Jawa Timur Jakarta: Grasindo. 
 Soemanto, Bakdi (1992) Cerita Rakyat dari Yogyakarta Jakarta: Grasindo. 
 Soemanto, Bakdi (1995) Cerita Rakyat dari Yogyakarta 2  Jakarta: Grasindo. 
 Soepanto, ed (1976) Ceritera Rakyat Daerah Istimewa Yogyakarta Yogyakarta: Proyek Penelitian dan Pencatatan Kebudayaan Daerah.

External links
Folklore Indonesia
Folk Orientation in Halmahera
Dedy Supriadi Adhur, Selling the Sea, Fishing for Power: A Study of Conflict Over Marine Tenure

Indonesian folklore
Indonesia
Folklore by region